Miss Universe 2022 was the 71st Miss Universe pageant, held at the New Orleans Morial Convention Center in New Orleans, Louisiana, United States on January 14, 2023.

Harnaaz Sandhu of India crowned R'Bonney Gabriel of the United States as Miss Universe 2022. It is the United States' first victory in 10 years, and the ninth entrant from the United States to win the title, as well as the oldest entrant to be crowned, surpassing Andrea Meza of Mexico in 2020.

Contestants from 84 countries and territories competed in this year's pageant. The competition was hosted by Jeannie Mai and Miss Universe 2012 Olivia Culpo; Culpo last served as host during Miss Universe 2020, while Mai last served as backstage correspondent during Miss Universe 2014. Miss Universe 2018 Catriona Gray and Zuri Hall served as backstage correspondents. This marks the first time in a 70-year history to have an all-female presenting panel.

This was the first edition of the pageant to be held under the ownership of Thailand-based JKN Global Group, which purchased the Miss Universe Organization from WME/IMG on October 26, 2022. The competition was the first event since 1954 not to be televised in any major American television network, but it would air on the streaming provider The Roku Channel as the official broadcaster of the show for the first time. It was also the first Miss Universe event to be aired by JKN Global Group's television networks, JKN18 and JKN-CNBC as the pageant's official broadcaster for Thailand where the expanded headquarters of Miss Universe Organization are located.

Background

Location and date

In September 2022, Puerto Rican newspaper El Vocero reported that an email had been sent to national directors stating that the 2022 edition of Miss Universe would be held in the first quarter of 2023, due to the potential clash of dates with the 2022 FIFA World Cup in November and December 2022. El Vocero also reported that Los Angeles, Miami, and New Orleans in the United States and Nha Trang in Vietnam were seen as potential host cities.

Later in September, Miss Universe Organization (MUO) president Paula Shugart stated in an interview with ABS-CBN News and Current Affairs that the pageant would be held in January 2023, confirming that the reason for the postponement was to avoid a potential conflict with the 2022 FIFA World Cup. Shugart additionally confirmed that the host city would likely be announced during the following week. On September 19, the MUO announced that the pageant would be held on January 14, 2023, at the New Orleans Morial Convention Center in New Orleans, Louisiana. This will be the fourth time in the pageant's history that the event is held after the relative calendar year has ended; this previously occurred during the 2014, 2016, and 2020 editions, when they all took place the following year.

Selection of participants 
Contestants from 84 countries and territories have been selected to compete in the competition. Eighteen of these delegates were appointed to their positions after being a runner-up of their national pageant or being selected through a casting process.

Chloe Powery-Doxey, the first runner-up of Miss Universe Cayman Islands 2022, was appointed to represent the Cayman Islands after the original winner, Tiffany Conolly, was alleged to have committed an assault. Floriane Bascou, the first runner-up of Miss France 2022, was appointed to represent France after the original winner, Diane Leyre, chose not to compete due to the lack of time for preparation. Camila Sanabria, the first runner-up of Miss Bolivia 2022, was appointed to represent Bolivia after the original winner, Fernanda Pavisic, was dethroned for mocking other Miss Universe candidates' headshots on her Instagram stories.

The 2022 edition saw the debut of Bhutan, and the returns of Angola, Belize, Indonesia, Kyrgyzstan, Lebanon, Malaysia, Myanmar, Saint Lucia, Seychelles, Switzerland, Trinidad and Tobago and Uruguay. Seychelles previously competed in 1995, making this edition its first time competing after an absence of 27 years. Trinidad and Tobago last competed in 2017, Kyrgyzstan, Lebanon, and Switzerland last competed in 2018, Angola and Saint Lucia last competed in 2019, while the others last competed in 2020. Denmark, Hungary, Ireland, Israel, Kenya, Morocco, Romania, and Sweden withdrew after their respective organizations failed to hold a national competition or appoint a delegate. Diana Tashimbetova was originally to represent Kazakhstan, but was dethroned and not replaced by the Kazakhstani license holder after a series of disputes between Tashimbetova and the license holder regarding the lack of support Tashimbetova received by them for her participation at Miss Universe. Latvia was expected to compete for the first time since 2006, but their chosen delegate Kate Alexeeva withdrew from the competition after testing positive for COVID-19 prior to her departure.

Results

Placements 

§ – Voted into the Top 16 by viewers

Special awards

Pageant

Format
The Miss Universe Organization introduced several specific changes to the format for this edition. Initially, it was speculated that the semifinalists would return to 20, similar to the number of semifinalists in 2018. However, the number of semifinalists was eventually reduced to 16 — the same number of semifinalists in 2021. The results of the preliminary competition — which consisted of the swimsuit competition, the evening gown competition, and the closed-door interview will determine the 16 semifinalists who will advance for the first cut. The internet voting is still being implemented, with fans being able to vote for another delegate to advance into the semifinals. The top 16 will be competing in both the swimsuit and evening gown competitions and are to be narrowed down to the top 5 afterwards. This is the first time in the pageant's history that a drastic cut would be made, from 16 to 5. The top 5 will be then competing in the preliminary question and answer round, and the final 3 will be chosen. The final word portion will be brought back, after which Miss Universe 2022 and her two runners-up will be announced.

Selection committee 
 Ximena Navarrete – Miss Universe 2010 from Mexico
 Big Freedia – American rapper and performer credited with helping popularize bounce music
 Mara Martin – American model and co-founder of Vyral Media PR
 Wendy Fitzwilliam – Miss Universe 1998 from Trinidad and Tobago
 Emily Austin – American actress, sports journalist, model and social media influencer
 Olivia Quido – Filipino-Chinese CEO and founder of O Skin Med Spa
 Myrka Dellanos – American television and radio host, journalist, author and socialite
 Sweta Patel – Indian vice president of Growth Marketing & Merchandising at Roku

 Olivia Jordan – Miss USA 2015 from Oklahoma (only as preliminary judge)
 Kathleen Ventrella – Puerto Rican chief marketing officer of ImpactWayv (only as preliminary judge)

Contestants
84 contestants competed for the title:

Notes

References

External links
 

2022
Universe
2023 in Louisiana
January 2023 events in the United States